The Aloha class is a pair of cargo ships built by Philly Shipyard for Matson.  The vessels are the largest of their type to be built in the United States.

Matson placed the $418 million order for the two ships in November 2013.  In October 2015, the ceremonial first steel cutting took place, with both ships to be built roughly in parallel until their deliveries in late 2018.  The first vessel, Daniel K. Inouye, was christened on 30 June 2018, though outfitting work continued until late in the year. She was delivered on 1 November, and made her first voyage to Hawaii later in the month.  The second ship, Kaimana Hila, was christened on 9 March 2019, and entered service in August.  Matson operates both ships from continental United States ports to Hawaii and Guam.

At  in length, and with a deadweight tonnage of 50,794 DWT, Aloha-class ships are the largest container ships ever built in the United States.

References

 https://www.matson.com/aloha-class.html
 https://investor.matson.com/news-releases/news-release-details/matson-philly-shipyard-mark-aloha-class-ship-construction

Cargo ships of the United States
Ship classes